Undone is the fourth book in Sara Humphreys’s The Amoveo Legend Series. It takes place after the events in Untamed.

Plot summary
Marianna Coltari wants nothing to do with the Amoveo civil war, she would rather live it up in the city and hang out at her favorite night club (that just happens to be run by a vampire coven).  When her brother Dante hires his human employee Pete Castro as her bodyguard, things get interesting.

Pete is a retired cop and doesn't want anything to do with guarding a party girl like Marianna but he is doing it as a favor for his friend.  But when Pete finds out about the Amoveo and the pair are in hiding from an enemy.

Pete is Marianna's lifemate and there attraction is undeniable but can he protect her.  But a person from Pete's past May hold the biggest secret of all and the means to fight their enemies.

Amoveo Legend
2013 American novels
American romance novels
Sourcebooks books